Dušan Tadić (born 20 November 1988) is a Serbian professional footballer who plays as a forward or attacking midfielder and captains both Eredivisie club Ajax and the Serbia national team.

Tadić spent his youth at hometown club AIK Bačka Topola and Vojvodina, eventually playing in the UEFA Europa League with the latter. After two seasons with Groningen he joined Twente in 2012, where he earned a move to Southampton of the Premier League. After four years in England, he returned to the Netherlands in 2018, when he joined Ajax.

Tadić has more than 90 caps for Serbia, having made his international debut in 2008, and represented the country at the Olympics in that year, as well as the 2018 and 2022 World Cup.

Club career

Vojvodina
Dušan Tadić grew up honing his skills within the youth ranks of his hometown's club known as AIK Bačka Topola. Eventually he signed a professional contract with Vojvodina and played his first competitive matches in the Meridian SuperLiga at the age of 18. While playing for Vojvodina, he gained invaluable experiences playing against great top-flight teams (even against Atlético Madrid) and playing almost four full seasons without any major injuries or incidents. His potential in big European games was displayed in the 2009–10 UEFA Europa League qualifying phase when he scored a goal against Austria Wien when he was only 20 years old.

Groningen

In 2010, Vojvodina sold Dušan Tadić to Groningen for the equivalent of €1.23 million. On 8 August 2010, Tadić made his official debut for the club in an Eredivisie match against Ajax, playing the full match and providing the assist for Tim Matavž's goal in a 2–2 home draw. On 18 December 2010, Tadić scored his first goal for Groningen, against Excelsior in a 2–2 away draw. On 30 January 2011, he scored twice and provided one assist in a 1–4 away league win over Heerenveen. Tadić finished the 2010–11 season with 7 goals, and 22 assists in 41 matches. He had the third highest number of assists in Europe for the 2010–11 season. Only Mesut Özil (26) and Lionel Messi (25) registered more assists.

He played for Groningen from 2010 to 2012, before being transferred to Twente.

Twente
On 10 April 2012, it was announced that Tadić had signed for Twente in a €7.7 million move from Groningen. In his debut game on 12 August 2012, he scored two goals against his former club. He finished his debut season as the team's second-highest scorer with 16 goals in all competitions, two less than Nacer Chadli. In the following season, Tadić again scored 16 goals across all competitions, being the team's top scorer.

Southampton

Tadić became the first signing under new Southampton manager Ronald Koeman on 8 July 2014, signing on a four-year deal. He joined for an undisclosed fee, thought to be £10.9 million. He made his competitive debut on 17 August in their first game of the Premier League season, playing 74 minutes of a 2–1 defeat at Liverpool before being substituted for fellow debutant Shane Long. Tadić assisted Southampton's goal through a one-two with goalscorer Nathaniel Clyne.

He scored his first Southampton goal on 23 September with a penalty against Arsenal in a 2–1 League Cup victory at Emirates Stadium. His first league goal for the club came in an 8–0 trouncing of Sunderland on 18 October, in which he assisted four others, equalling the Premier League record for the most assists in a single match.

On 13 December, Tadić had a penalty saved by Tom Heaton as Southampton went on to lose 1–0 away to Burnley. He scored in a 2–0 win over Arsenal on 1 January 2015, and ten days later scored the only goal as Southampton defeated Manchester United at Old Trafford and rose into third position at their expense. This marked Southampton's first league victory at Old Trafford since 1988.

Tadić scored twice in a 3–0 win against Norwich City on 30 August 2015 for the Saints' first league win of the season.

He scored another brace in a 4–2 win over relegated Aston Villa on 23 April 2016. In the next game, he provided three assists in a 4–2 win over Manchester City, becoming only the fourth player to achieve three or more assists in more than one Premier League game.

Ajax

Tadić signed for Dutch club Ajax in June 2018. Ajax paid a transfer sum of €11.4 million, which could reach €13.7 million based on variables.

On 5 March 2019, Tadić’s goal, two assists and man-of-the-match performance helped knock Real Madrid out of the last 16 of the Champions League, as Ajax unexpectedly won 4–1 at the Santiago Bernabéu Stadium. The Spanish side had won the previous three Champions League titles and had beaten Ajax 2–1 in the first leg in Amsterdam. Tadić's performance in the game resulted in him becoming the ninth player ever to receive a 10/10 rating from the French football newspaper, L'Equipe. The signing of Tadić was seen by some pundits as the single biggest reason for Ajax’s improvement in the 2018–19 season.

On 23 April 2019, Ajax defeated Vitesse in an Eredivisie match by a score of 4–2; the four goals scored by Ajax secured their position as the first Dutch team in history to score 160 goals across all competitions in a single season. Through 51 games played at the time, Tadić had directly contributed to 53 of the club's goals in all competitions: 34 goals and 19 assists.

Tadić would eventually go on to lead Ajax to the Champions League Semi-Finals, while earning a spot on the UEFA Champions League Squad of the Season. He would also be nominated for the 2019 Ballon d'Or, and at the ceremony on 2 December 2019, it was announced that he finished in 20th place.

On 2 May 2021, Ajax were crowned Dutch league Champions. Tadić had the honor of being awarded Dutch Footballer of the Year.

International career
Tadić was a regular member of Serbia's under-19 and under-21 teams, taking part at both the 2007 UEFA European Under-19 Championship and the 2009 UEFA European Under-21 Championship. He also represented Serbia at the 2008 Summer Olympics, appearing in all three group stage matches.

Tadić was first named in the Serbia national squad in 2008, aged 20. It was not until 2011 that he became a regular fixture in both the squad and the team, and was an integral part of the national side during Serbia's unsuccessful attempt to qualify for the 2014 FIFA World Cup in Brazil. Tadić scored his first senior goal for his country in the 2014 FIFA World Cup qualification game at home to Wales on 12 September 2012 in a 6–1 victory, coming on the occasion of his eighth full cap.

Tadić was one of Serbia's most influential players during the 2018 FIFA World Cup qualifications, scoring four goals and helping them win their group. In June 2018 he was selected in the 23-man squad for the final tournament, playing all three group stage matches.

In November 2022, he captained Serbia in the 2022 FIFA World Cup in Qatar. He played in all three group stage matches, against Brazil, Cameroon and Switzerland. He provided two assists, one in a match against Cameroon, and another one against Switzerland. Serbia finished fourth in the group.

Career statistics

Club

International

Scores and results list Serbia's goal tally first, score column indicates score after each Tadić goal.

Honours
Vojvodina
 Serbian Cup runner-up: 2009–10

Southampton
 EFL Cup runner-up: 2016–17

Ajax
 Eredivisie: 2018–19, 2020–21, 2021–22
 KNVB Cup: 2018–19, 2020–21
Johan Cruyff Shield: 2019

Individual
 Serbian SuperLiga Team of the Season: 2009–10
 Groningen C1000 Player of the Year: 2010–11
 Eredivisie Team of the Year: 2013–14, 2018–19, 2020–21
 Eredivisie Top Assists: 2010–11, 2013–14, 2018–19 (shared with Hakim Ziyech), 2019–20, 2020–21, 2021–22
 Eredivisie Top Scorer: 2018–19 (shared with Luuk de Jong)

 Serbian Player of the Year: 2016, 2019, 2021
 UEFA Champions League Squad of the Season: 2018–19
 UEFA Europa League Squad of the Season: 2020–21
 Eredivisie Player of the Year:  2020–21
 Ajax Player of the Year (Rinus Michels Award): 2020–21
 Dutch Footballer of the Year: 2020–21

References

External links

Profile at the AFC Ajax website

Dušan Tadić at Voetbal International 
Dušan Tadić at Just-Football.com

1988 births
Living people
People from Bačka Topola
Serbian footballers
Association football midfielders
FK TSC Bačka Topola players
FK Vojvodina players
FC Groningen players
FC Twente players
Southampton F.C. players
AFC Ajax players
Serbian SuperLiga players
Eredivisie players
Premier League players
Serbia under-21 international footballers
Olympic footballers of Serbia
Serbia international footballers
Footballers at the 2008 Summer Olympics
2018 FIFA World Cup players
2022 FIFA World Cup players
Serbian expatriate footballers
Serbian expatriate sportspeople in the Netherlands
Serbian expatriate sportspeople in England
Expatriate footballers in the Netherlands
Expatriate footballers in England